Coleophora sibirica is a moth of the family Coleophoridae. It is found in Russia (Minusinsk, Baikal).

References

sibirica
Moths of Asia
Moths described in 1924